Sceloporus bicanthalis, the trans volcanic bunchgrass lizard, is a species of lizard in the family Phrynosomatidae, first described by Hobart Muir Smith as a subspecies of Sceloporus aeneus in 1937. It is endemic to Mexico. It was classified by the IUCN as a species with low risk. No subspecies are recognized.

Description
Sceloporus bicanthalis is a small, viviparous lizard measuring on average  in snout–vent length.

Distribution and habitat
Sceloporus bicanthalis ranges eastwards from the eastern Valley of Mexico to the eastern end the Trans-Mexican Volcanic Belt, and into the northern Sierra Madre de Oaxaca.

This species is associated with tussock (bunchgrass) grassland habitats within open pine forests at elevations of  asl.

References

Sceloporus
Endemic reptiles of Mexico
Fauna of the Trans-Mexican Volcanic Belt
Fauna of the Sierra Madre de Oaxaca
Reptiles described in 1937
Taxa named by Hobart Muir Smith